This is a list of artists that once recorded for Island Records or one of its associated labels.



Current

A
 Adrian Eagle
 Alice Skye
 Amber Van Day
 Angèle
 Anthrax (American band)
 Ariana Grande
 Aydan
 Azure Ryder

B
 Baby Queen
 Baker Boy
 Barkaa
 Banners
 Belly
 Ben Howard
 Benee
 Birdz
 Blanco
 Bon Jovi
 Briggs
 Broods

C
 Camylio
 Cap Carter
 Catfish and the Bottlemen
 Charlie Collins
 Chaka Khan
 Charlieonafriday
 Chelsea Cutler
 Chiiild
 Clare Bowditch
 Conan Gray

D
 D-Aye
 Dean Lewis
 Demi Lovato
 Dermot Kennedy
 Disclosure
 Dizzee Rascal
 Drake

E
 Easy Life
 Eliott
 Ella Eyre
 Emily Burns
 Emotional Oranges

F
 The Feeling
 FLO
 Flyte

G
 Giggs
 Gwen Bunn

H
 Hailee Steinfeld
 Harlee
 Havana Brown
 Hilltop Hoods
 Hozier

I
 Isabella Manfredi
 Iyah May

J
 Jack Fowler
 Jack Garratt
 Jaden Smith
 James Hype
 James TW
 Jamie Cullum
 Jarryd James
 Jazmin Bean
 Jazmine Flowers
 Jeremy Zucker
 Jessia
 Jessie J
 Jessie Reyez
 Johnny Orlando
 Jordan Nash
 Josie Proto
 JP Cooper
 Jufu

K
 Keane
 Keshi
 Kevin George
 Kid Brunswick
 Kid Cudi
 Kidd Kenn
 The Killers
 Kim Petras
 Kobie Dee
 Kris Wu

L
 LA Women
 Lakyn
 The Lathums
 Lil Wayne
 Lola Young
 Londin Thompson
 Los Leo
 Lost Girl

M
 M Huncho
 Marcellus Juvann
 Mason Maynard
 Matt Corby
 The McClymonts
 Meduza
 Metro Boomin
 The Million
 Miraa May
 Mishlawi
 Miss LaFamilia
 Mt. Desolation
 Mumford & Sons

N
 The Naked and Famous
 Navos
 Nick Jonas
 Nicki Minaj
 Noah Kahan
 Noisy
 Nooky
 NOTD

O
 Oh Wonder
 Olivia O'Brien
 OneRepublic
 Owenn

P
 Peach PRC
 Philla
 Picard Brothers
 Polish Club
 Post Malone
 Poutyface

R
 Ray BLK
 Remi Wolf
 The Riot
 Ritual
 Robyn
 Ruby Boots
 Running Touch
 Rynx

S
 Sabrina Carpenter
 Sam Tompkins
 San Joseph
 Sea Girls
 Sean Paul
 Selasie
 Seth Sentry
 Shane Nicholson
 Shawn Mendes
 Sigrid
 Ski Mask the Slump God
 Skip Marley
 Sneakbo
 Stacey Ryan
 Sparks
 The Specials
 Sports Team
 The Streets
 Steve Winwood
 Swedish House Mafia

T
 Tame Impala
 Tekno
 Thundamentals
 Tigerlily
 Tom Chaplin
 Toni Braxton
 Tori Forsyth
 Trials
 Twocolors

U
 U2
 Unknown T

V
 Vera Blue

W
 The Wanted
 The Weeknd
 WEISS
 Winterbourne

Y
 Yard Act
 Yorke
 Young Devyn

Z
 Zak Abel
 Ziekel

Former

0–9
 49ers
 The 77s
 The 88

A
 Ai (Universal Sigma/Island)
 Aleka's Attic
 Alex Reece (Quango/Island)
 Alexei Sayle
 AlunaGeorge
 Amazing Blondel
 Amazulu (Mango/Island)
 Amber Lily
 Ambersunshower (Gee Street/Island)
 American Hi-Fi
 Amnesia (Supreme/Island)
 Amy Winehouse
 Andrew W.K.
 Andy Gibb
 Angélique Kidjo (Mango/Island)
 Annie
 Anthrax (Megaforce/Island)
 Apache Indian (Mango/Island)
 Arrow (Mango/Island)
 Art
 Art of Noise (ZTT/Island)
 Aswad
 Autopilot Off
 Avicii

B
 The B-52's (outside Americas/Australia)
 Bad Company (UK/Europe)
 Beenie Man (Island Jamaica)
 Bernard Szajner
 Bill Laswell (Axiom/Island)
 Bhundu Boys 
 Black Uhuru
 Black Rebel Motorcycle Club
 Blancmange
 Blessing Annatoria (Island UK)
 Bob Dylan (Island UK)
 Bob Marley (Tuff Gong/Island)
 Bomb the Bass (Quango/Island)
 Boo-Yaa T.R.I.B.E. (4th & B'way/Island)
 Boukman Eksperyans (Mango/Island)
 Boy Kill Boy
 Blue in Heaven
 Brian Eno
 Bronco
 The Bronx
 Bryan Ferry (E.G./Island)
 Bryn Haworth
 Brutha
 Buckwheat Zydeco
 The Buggles
 Buju Banton (Loose Cannon/Island)
 Burning Flames
 Burning Spear
 Busted
 By All Means (4th & B'way/Island)

C
 Cat Stevens (outside North America)
 Caviar
 Chaba Fadela (Mango/Island)
 Chaka Demus & Pliers (Mango/Island)
 Charlélie Couture
 Charlie Peacock
 The Chieftains
 Christina Grimmie
 Cimorelli
 CKY
 Claire Hamill
 Claytown Troupe
 Clocks
 Clouds
 Clubland (Great Jones/Island)
 Cord
 The Cranberries

D
 Daddy-O
 Damone
 Daniel Bedingfield
 Darol Anger (Six Degrees/Island)
 Def Leppard (US/Canada/Argentina)
 Dennis Cowan
 Deus
 Die Trying
 Dillinger
 Dino (4th & B'way/Island)
 The Disposable Heroes of Hiphoprisy (4th & B'way/Island)
 The Distractions
 Dogs (band)
 Double Dee and Steinski (4th & B'way/Island)
 Doug E. Fresh (Gee Street Independent/Island)
 Dr. Strangely Strange
 Dhar Braxton (Sleeping Bag/Fourth and Broadway/Island)
 Dream Warriors (4th & B'way/Island)
 Drivin' N' Cryin'
 Drizabone (4th & B'way/Island)
 Dru Hill

E
 Earl Brutus (Fruition/Island)
 Eddie and the Hot Rods
 Eek-A-Mouse (Peace Posse/Island)
 Electric Company (Supreme/Island)
 Electrovamp
 Elkie Brooks
 Elton John (Rocket/Island) (US)
 Emerson, Lake & Palmer (UK/Europe)
 Engine Alley
 Eric B. & Rakim (4th & B'way/Island)
 Etta James
 Everlast
 Melissa Etheridge

F
 Fairport Convention
 The Feeling
 Fefe Dobson
 Fightstar
 Dr. Fiorella Terenzi
 Florence and the Machine
 Fotheringay
 Frankie Goes to Hollywood (ZTT/Island)
 Frankmusik
 Free (outside US/Canada until 1972)
 Freestyle Fellowship (4th & B'way/Island)

G
 Gabriella Cilmi
 Galinha Pintadinha
 Gavin Christopher
 George Michael (Ægean/Island)
 Georgie Fame
 Gianna Kondor
 Grace Jones
 Gravediggaz (Gee Street/Island)
 Gregory Isaacs

H
 Hanson
 Harry Belafonte
 Hi Tension
 Hinda Hicks
 Hoobastank
 Howie B. (Island Independent)

I
 Iamnotshane
 If
 Iggy Azalea
 Illusuion
 Incredible String Band
 Injected
 Innerpartysystem
 Insane Clown Posse
 Isis (4th & B'way/Island)
 The Isley Brothers

J
 J. Holiday
 Jackie Edwards
 Jade Warrior
 The Jags
 Janet Jackson
 Javine Hylton
 Jennifer Lopez
 Jess Roden
 Jessie Ware
 Jethro Tull (Chrysalis/Island)
 Jimmie's Chicken Shack (Rocket/Island)
 Jimmy Buffett (Margaritaville/Island)
 Jimmy Cliff
 John Cale
 John Martyn
 Jon McLaughlin
 Jim Capaldi
 Julian Cope
 Justin Bieber

K
 Keisha Buchanan
 Kerli
 Kevin Ayers
 Khaled (Mango/Island)
 Khalil
 Kid Creole & the Coconuts (Europe)
 Kim Fowley
 King Crimson (UK/Europe)
 King Sunny Adé (Mango/Island)
 Kruder & Dorfmeister (Quango/Island)
 KSI (Universal/Island)
 Kym Marsh

L
 Ladytron
 LaTour (Smash/Island)
 Laura Warshauer
 Leatherwolf
 Lee "Scratch" Perry
 Letter Kills
 Linda Thompson
 Local H
 Low Art Thrill (Fruition/Island)
 Luciano (Island Jamaica)
 Lucy Walsh

M
 Mach Five
 Macy Gray
 Madison Beer
 Marc Broussard
 Mariah Carey (MonarC/Island)
 M/A/R/R/S (4th & B'way/Island)
 Material (Axiom/Island)
 Malcolm McLaren
 Margareth Menezes (Mango/Island)
 Marianne Faithfull
 Max Romeo
 McFly
 Melissa Etheridge
 Mica Paris
 Michael Nesmith
 The Mighty Bop (Quango/Island)
 Mikaila
 Miles Jaye
 Mobb Deep (4th & B'way/Island)
 Mona Lisa
 Morrissey
 Morten Harket (We Love Music/Island)
 Mott the Hoople (except US/Canada)
 Mountain
 Murray Head
 Mutya Buena

N
 N-Dubz
 Nasty Pop
 Natalie Imbruglia
 Nearly God (Durban Poison/Island Independent)
 New Kingdom (Gee Street/Island)
 Nick Drake
 Nico
 Nightcrawlers (Great Jones/Island)
 Nine Black Alps
 Nine Inch Nails (Europe)
 Nirvana UK
 No Warning
 Noel (4th & B'way/Island)
 Nuance (4th & B'way/Island)

O
 The Orb

P
 Peshay (Island Blue)
 Pete Wingfield
 Peter Sarstedt
 Peter Skellern
 Phil Manzanera (E.G./Island)
 Phranc
 Pitchshifter
 PlayRadioPlay!
 PM Dawn (Gee Street/Island)
 Positive K
 The Pogues
 Poppy
 Pound
 Praxis (Axiom/Island)
 Primer 55
 Propaganda
 Puressence

Q
 Queen (except US/Canada)
 Quicksand
 Quintessence

R
 Redd Kross
 Renaissance (except the US and Canada)
 Richard Thompson
 Ringo Starr
 Rival Schools
 Robert Owens (4th & B'way/Island)
 Robert Palmer
 Robbie Williams
 Rockers Hi-Fi (4th & Broadway)
 The Rocket Summer
 Roni Size (Talkin' Loud/Island)
 Ronnie Lane
 Ronny Jordan (4th & B'way/Island)
 Roxy Music (Europe)
 Rusted Root
 Ryan Star

S
 Salif Keita (Mango/Island)
 Saliva
 Sandy Denny
 Shankar (Axiom/Island)
 Sheep on Drugs (Smash/Island)
 Shelby Lynne (Island Nashville)
 Simon Shaheen
 The Slits
 Sly & Robbie
 Soraya
 Soup Dragons
 Spanner Banner (Island Jamaica)
 Speedy Keen
 Spencer Davis Group
 Spooky Tooth
 Spring Heel Jack (Island Independent)
 Startled Insects
 Steel Pulse
 Stereo MCs (Gee Street/Island)
 Steve Harvey
 Steve Winwood
 Stevie Salas
 Sue Draheim
 Sugababes
 Sum 41
 Sutherland Brothers & Quiver

T
 Taio Cruz (Mercury/Island)
 Takota
 Terra Naomi
 Third World
 Thrice
 Thursday
 Tom Tom Club
 Tone Loc (Delicious Vinyl/Island)
 Tony D (4th & B'way/Island)
 Toots & the Maytals
 Tom Waits
 Tori Amos
 Tove Lo
 Traffic
 Talvin Singh
 Tricky
 Tripping Daisy
 Trouble Funk
 Twiztid
 Tyler James

U
 Ultravox
 Uman (Six Degrees/Island)
 Umar Bin Hassan (Axiom/Island)
 Utada

V
 V
 V V Brown
 Vain
 Vanessa Amorosi
 Vinegar Joe
 The V.I.P.'s

W
 Wallis Bird
 Wally Badarou
 War
 The Waterboys
 The Wedding Present
 White Noise
 Wild Tchoupitoulas (Mango/Island)
 Wiley
 Will Downing (4th & B'way/Island)
 William S. Burroughs (Island Red Label)
 Willie Nelson
 Wilton Place Street Band
 Wolfmother
 Wynder K. Frog

X
 X-Clan (4th & B'way/Island)

Y
 The Yeah You's
 Yello (Smash/Island)
 Young MC (Delicious Vinyl/Island)

Z
 Chaba Zahouania (Mango/Island)

References

Island Records